{{DISPLAYTITLE:C22H28N2O}}
The molecular formula C22H28N2O may refer to:

 Fentanyl
 Isofentanyl, or 3-methyl-benzylfentanyl
 α-Methylacetylfentanyl
 4-Methylphenethylacetylfentanyl

Molecular formulas